Stephanomiidae is a family of cnidarians belonging to the order Siphonophorae.

Genera:
 Stephanomia Lesueur & Petit, 1807

References

Physonectae
Cnidarian families